King Kong is a fictional giant monster resembling a gorilla, who has appeared in various media since 1933. He has been dubbed The Eighth Wonder of the World, a phrase commonly used within the franchise. His first appearance was in the novelization of the 1933 film King Kong from RKO Pictures, with the film premiering a little over two months later. Upon its initial release and subsequent re-releases, the film received wide acclaim. A sequel quickly followed that same year with The Son of Kong, featuring Little Kong. Toho produced King Kong vs. Godzilla (1962) featuring a giant Kong battling Toho's Godzilla and King Kong Escapes (1967), a film loosely based on Rankin/Bass' The King Kong Show (1966-1969). In 1976, Dino De Laurentiis produced a modern remake of the original film directed by John Guillermin. A sequel, King Kong Lives, followed a decade later featuring a Lady Kong. Another remake of the original, this time set in 1933, was released in 2005 by filmmaker Peter Jackson.

Kong: Skull Island (2017), set in 1973, is part of Legendary Entertainment's MonsterVerse, which began with Legendary's reboot of Godzilla in 2014. A sequel, Godzilla vs. Kong, once again pitting the characters against one another, was released in March 2021.

The character of King Kong has become one of the world's most famous movie icons, having inspired a number of sequels, remakes, spin-offs, imitators, parodies, cartoons, books, comics, video games, theme park rides, and a stage play. King Kong has also crossed over into other franchises such as Planet of the Apes, and encountered characters from other franchises in crossover media, such as the Toho movie monster Godzilla, as well as pulp characters Doc Savage and Tarzan. His role in the different narratives varies, ranging from a rampaging monster to a tragic antihero.

Overview
 The King Kong character was conceived and created by American filmmaker Merian C. Cooper. In the original film, the character's name is Kong, a name given to him by the inhabitants of the fictional "Skull Island" in the Indian Ocean, where Kong lives along with other oversized animals, such as plesiosaurs, pterosaurs and various dinosaurs. An American film crew, led by Carl Denham, captures Kong and takes him to New York City to be exhibited as the "Eighth Wonder of the World".

Kong escapes and climbs the Empire State Building, only to fall from the skyscraper after being attacked by biplanes with guns. Denham comments "it wasn't the aeroplanes, It was beauty killed the beast", for he climbs the building in the first place only in an attempt to protect Ann Darrow, an actress originally kidnapped by the natives of the island and offered up to Kong as a sacrifice (in the 1976 remake, her character is named "Dwan").

A pseudo-documentary about Skull Island that appears on the DVD for the 2005 remake (originally seen on the Sci-Fi Channel at the time of its theatrical release) gives Kong's scientific name as Megaprimatus kong ("Megaprimatus", deriving from the prefix "mega-" and the Latin words "primate" and "primatus", means "big primate" or "big supreme being") and states that his species may be related to Gigantopithecus, though that genus of giant ape is more closely related to orangutans than to gorillas.

Conception and creation

Merian C. Cooper became fascinated by gorillas at the age of 6. In 1899, he was given a book from his uncle called Explorations and Adventures in Equatorial Africa. The book (written in 1861), chronicled the adventures of Paul Du Chaillu in Africa and his various encounters with the natives and wildlife there. Cooper became fascinated with the stories involving the gorillas, in particular, Du Chaillu's depiction of a particular gorilla known for its "extraordinary size", that the natives described as "invincible" and the "King of the African Forest". When Du Chaillu and some natives encountered a gorilla later in the book he described it as a "hellish dream creature" that was "half man, half beast".

As an adult, Cooper became involved in the motion picture industry. While filming The Four Feathers in Africa, he came into contact with a family of baboons. This gave him the idea to make a picture about primates. A year later when he got to RKO, Cooper wanted to film a "terror gorilla picture". As the story was being fleshed out, Cooper decided to make his gorilla giant sized. Cooper stated that the idea of Kong fighting warplanes on top of a building came from him seeing a plane flying over the New York Insurance Building, then the tallest building in the world. He came up with the ending before the rest of the story as he stated, "Without any conscious effort of thought I immediately saw in my mind's eye a giant gorilla on top of the building". Cooper also was influenced by Douglas Burden's accounts of the Komodo dragon, and wanted to pit his terror gorilla against dinosaur-sized versions of these reptiles, stating to Burden, "I also had firmly in mind to giantize both the gorilla and your dragons to make them really huge. However I always believed in personalizing and focusing attention on one main character and from the very beginning I intended to make it the gigantic gorilla, no matter what else I surrounded him with". Around this time, Cooper began to refer to his project as a "giant terror gorilla picture" featuring "a gigantic semi-humanoid gorilla pitted against modern civilization".

When designing King Kong, Cooper wanted him to be a nightmarish gorilla monster. As he described Kong in a 1930 memo, "His hands and feet have the size and strength of steam shovels; his girth is that of a steam boiler. This is a monster with the strength of a hundred men. But more terrifying is the head—a nightmare head with bloodshot eyes and jagged teeth set under a thick mat of hair, a face half-beast half-human". Willis O'Brien created an oil painting depicting the giant gorilla menacing a jungle heroine and hunter for Cooper. However, when it came time for O'Brien and Marcel Delgado to sculpt the animation model, Cooper decided to backpedal on the half-human look for the creature and became adamant that Kong be a gorilla. O'Brien on the other hand, wanted him to be almost human-like to gain audience empathy, and told Delgado to "make that ape almost human". Cooper laughed at the end result, saying that it looked like a cross between a monkey and a man with very long hair. For the second model, O'Brien again asked Delgado to add human features but to tone it down somewhat. The end result (which was rejected) was described as looking like a missing link. Disappointed, Cooper stated, "I want Kong to be the fiercest, most brutal, monstrous damned thing that has ever been seen!" On December 22, 1931, Cooper got the dimensions of a bull gorilla from the American Museum of Natural History telling O'Brien, "Now that's what I want!" When the final model was created, it had the basic look of a gorilla but managed to retain some human-like qualities. For example, Delgado streamlined the body by removing the distinctive paunch and rump of a gorilla. O'Brien would incorporate some characteristics and nuances of an earlier creature he had created in 1915 for the silent short The Dinosaur and the Missing Link into the general look and personality of Kong, even going as far as to refer to the creature as "Kong's ancestor". When it came time to film, Cooper agreed that Kong should walk upright at times (mostly in the New York sequences) in order to appear more intimidating.

Etymology
Merian C. Cooper said he was very fond of strong, hard-sounding words that started with the letter "K". Some of his favorite words were "Komodo", "Kodiak" and "Kodak". When Cooper was envisioning his giant terror gorilla idea, he wanted to capture a real gorilla from the Congo and have it fight a real Komodo dragon on Komodo Island (this scenario would eventually evolve into Kong's battle with the tyrannosaur on Skull Island when the film was produced a few years later at RKO). Cooper's friend Douglas Burden's trip to the island of Komodo and his encounter with the Komodo dragons was a big influence on the Kong story. Cooper was fascinated by Burden's adventures as chronicled in his book Dragon Lizards of Komodo where he referred to the animal as the "King of Komodo". It was this phrase along with "Komodo" and "Kongo"  (and his overall love for hard sounding "K"-words) that gave him the idea to name the giant ape "Kong". He loved the name, as it had a "mystery sound" to it.

After Cooper got to RKO, British mystery writer Edgar Wallace was contracted to write the first draft of the screen story. It was simply referred to as "The Beast". RKO executives were unimpressed with the bland title. David O. Selznick suggested Jungle Beast as the film's new title, but Cooper was unimpressed and wanted to name the film after the main character. He stated he liked the "mystery word" aspect of Kong's name and that the film should carry "the name of the leading mysterious, romantic, savage creature of the story" such as with Dracula and Frankenstein. RKO sent a memo to Cooper suggesting the titles Kong: King of Beasts, Kong: The Jungle King, and Kong: The Jungle Beast, which combined his and Selznick's proposed titles. As time went on, Cooper would eventually name the story simply Kong while Ruth Rose was writing the final version of the screenplay. Because David O. Selznick thought that audiences would think that the film, with the one word title of Kong, would be mistaken as a docudrama like Grass and Chang, which were one-word titled films that Cooper had earlier produced, he added the "King" to Kong's name in order to differentiate it.

Appearances and abilities
In his first appearance in King Kong (1933), Kong was a gigantic prehistoric ape. While gorilla-like in appearance, he had a vaguely humanoid look and at times walked upright in an anthropomorphic manner.

Like most simians, Kong possesses semi-human intelligence and great physical strength. Kong's size changes drastically throughout the course of the film.

As Cooper stated in an interview:

Concurrently, the Kong bust made for the film was built in scale with a  ape, while the full sized hand of Kong was built in scale with a  ape.

In the 1960s, Toho Studios from Japan licensed the character for the films King Kong vs. Godzilla and King Kong Escapes. For more details on these versions of the character, see below.

In 1975, Italian producer Dino De Laurentiis paid RKO for the remake rights to King Kong. This resulted in King Kong (1976). This Kong was an upright walking anthropomorphic ape, appearing even more human-like than the original. Also like the original, this Kong had semi-human intelligence and vast strength. Ten years later, Dino De Laurentiis got the approval from Universal to do a sequel called King Kong Lives.

Universal Studios had planned to do a King Kong remake as far back as 1976. They finally followed through almost 30 years later, with a three-hour film directed by Peter Jackson. Jackson opted to make Kong a gigantic silverback gorilla without any anthropomorphic features. This Kong looked and behaved more like a real gorilla: he had a large herbivore's belly, walked on his knuckles without any upright posture, and even beat his chest with his palms as opposed to clenched fists. In order to ground his Kong in realism, Jackson and the Weta Digital crew gave a name to his fictitious species Megaprimatus kong and suggested it to have evolved from the Gigantopithecus. Kong was the last of his kind. He was portrayed in the film as being quite old, with graying fur and battle-worn with scars, wounds, and a crooked jaw from his many fights against rival creatures. He is the dominant being on the island, the king of his world. But, like his film predecessors, he possesses considerable intelligence and great physical strength; he also appears far more nimble and agile. Jackson describes his central character:

Director Jordan Vogt-Roberts stated in regard to Kong's immense stature:

He also stated that the original 1933 look was the inspiration for the design, saying:

Co-producer Mary Parent also stated that Kong is still young and not fully grown as she explains, "Kong is an adolescent when we meet him in the film; he's still growing into his role as alpha".

Ownership rights
While one of the most famous movie icons in history, King Kong's intellectual property status has been questioned since his creation, featuring in numerous allegations and court battles. The rights to the character have always been split up with no single exclusive rights holder. Different parties have also contested that various aspects are public domain material and therefore ineligible for copyright status.

When Merian C. Cooper created King Kong, he assumed that he owned the character, which he had conceived in 1929, outright. Cooper maintained that he had only licensed the character to RKO for the initial film and sequel, but had otherwise owned his own creation. In 1935, Cooper began to feel something was amiss when he was trying to get a Tarzan vs. King Kong project off the ground for Pioneer Pictures (where he had assumed management of the company). After David O. Selznick suggested the project to Cooper, the flurry of legal activity over using the Kong character that followed—Pioneer had become a completely independent company by this time and access to properties that RKO felt were theirs was no longer automatic—gave Cooper pause as he came to realize that he might not have full control over this product of his own imagination after all.

Years later in 1962, Cooper found out that RKO was licensing the character through John Beck to Toho studios in Japan for a film project called King Kong vs. Godzilla. Cooper had assumed his rights were unassailable and was bitterly opposed to the project. In 1963 he filed a lawsuit to enjoin distribution of the movie against John Beck, as well as Toho and Universal (the film's U.S. copyright holder). Cooper discovered that RKO had also profited from licensed products featuring the King Kong character such as model kits produced by Aurora Plastics Corporation. Cooper's executive assistant, Charles B. FitzSimons, stated that these companies should be negotiating through him and Cooper for such licensed products and not RKO. In a letter to Robert Bendick, Cooper stated:

Cooper and his legal team offered up various documents to bolster the case that Cooper owned King Kong and had only licensed the character to RKO for two films, rather than selling him outright. Many people vouched for Cooper's claims, including David O. Selznick, who had written a letter to Mr. A. Loewenthal of the Famous Artists Syndicate in Chicago in 1932 stating (in regard to Kong), "The rights of this are owned by Mr. Merian C. Cooper." But Cooper had lost key documents through the years (he discovered these papers were missing after he returned from his World War II military service) such as a key informal yet binding letter from Mr. Ayelsworth (the then-president of the RKO Studio Corp.) and a formal binding letter from Mr. B. B. Kahane (the current president of RKO Studio Corp.) confirming that Cooper had only licensed the rights to the character for the two RKO pictures and nothing more.

Without these letters, it seemed Cooper's rights were relegated to the Lovelace novelization that he had copyrighted (he was able to make a deal for a Bantam Books paperback reprint and a Gold Key comic adaptation of the novel, but that was all that he could do). Cooper's lawyer had received a letter from John Beck's lawyer, Gordon E. Youngman, that stated:

In a letter addressed to Douglas Burden, Cooper lamented:

The rights over the character did not flare up again until 1975, when Universal Studios and Dino De Laurentiis were fighting over who would be able to do a King Kong remake for release the following year. De Laurentiis came up with $200,000 to buy the remake rights from RKO. When Universal got wind of this, they filed a lawsuit against RKO, claiming that they had a verbal agreement from them regarding the remake. During the legal battles that followed, which eventually included RKO countersuing Universal, as well as De Laurentiis filing a lawsuit claiming interference, Colonel Richard Cooper (Merian's son and now head of the Cooper estate) jumped into the fray.

During the battles, Universal discovered that the copyright of the Lovelace novelization had expired without renewal, thus making the King Kong story a public domain one. Universal argued that they should be able to make a movie based on the novel without infringing on anyone's copyright because the characters in the story were in the public domain within the context of the public domain story. Richard Cooper then filed a cross-claim against RKO claiming that, while the publishing rights to the novel had not been renewed, his estate still had control over the plot/story of King Kong.

In a four-day bench trial in Los Angeles, Judge Manuel Real made the final decision and gave his verdict on November 24, 1976, affirming that the King Kong novelization and serialization were indeed in the public domain, and Universal could make its movie as long as it did not infringe on original elements in the 1933 RKO film, which had not passed into the public domain (Universal postponed their plans to film a King Kong movie, called The Legend of King Kong, for at least 18 months, after cutting a deal with Dino De Laurentiis that included a percentage of box office profits from his remake).

However, on December 6, 1976, Judge Real made a subsequent ruling, which held that all the rights in the name, character, and story of King Kong (outside of the original film and its sequel) belonged to Merian C. Cooper's estate. This ruling, which became known as the "Cooper judgment", expressly stated that it would not change the previous ruling that publishing rights of the novel and serialization were in the public domain. It was a huge victory that affirmed the position Merian C. Cooper had maintained for years. Shortly thereafter, Richard Cooper sold all his rights (excluding worldwide book and periodical publishing rights) to Universal in December 1976. In 1980 Judge Real dismissed the claims that were brought forth by RKO and Universal four years earlier and reinstated the Cooper judgement.

In 1982 Universal filed a lawsuit against Nintendo, which had created an impish ape character called Donkey Kong in 1981 and was reaping huge profits over the video game machines. Universal claimed that Nintendo was infringing on its copyright because Donkey Kong was a blatant rip-off of King Kong. During the court battle and subsequent appeal, the courts ruled that Universal did not have exclusive trademark rights to the King Kong character. The courts ruled that trademark was not among the rights Cooper had sold to Universal, indicating that "Cooper plainly did not obtain any trademark rights in his judgment against RKO, since the California district court specifically found that King Kong had no secondary meaning." While they had a majority of the rights, they did not outright own the King Kong name and character. The courts ruling noted that the name, title, and character of Kong no longer signified a single source of origin so exclusive trademark rights were impossible. The courts also pointed out that the Kong rights were held by three parties:

 RKO owned the rights to the original film and its sequel.
 The Dino De Laurentiis company (DDL) owned the rights to the 1976 remake.
 Richard Cooper owned worldwide book and periodical publishing rights.

The judge then ruled that "Universal thus owns only those rights in the King Kong name and character that RKO, Cooper, or DDL do not own."

The court of appeals would also note:

Because Universal misrepresented their degree of ownership of King Kong (claiming they had exclusive trademark rights when they knew that they did not) and tried to have it both ways in court regarding the "public domain" claims, the courts ruled that Universal acted in bad faith (see Universal City Studios, Inc. v. Nintendo Co., Ltd.). They were ordered to pay fines and all of Nintendo's legal costs from the lawsuit. That, along with the fact that the courts ruled that there was simply no likelihood of people confusing Donkey Kong with King Kong, caused Universal to lose the case and the subsequent appeal.

Since the court case, Universal still retains the majority of the character rights. In 1986 they opened a King Kong ride called King Kong Encounter at their Universal Studios Tour theme park in Hollywood (which was destroyed in 2008 by a backlot fire), and followed it up with the Kongfrontation ride at their Orlando park in 1990 (which was closed down in 2002 due to maintenance issues). They also finally made a King Kong film of their own, King Kong (2005). In the summer of 2010, Universal opened a new 3D King Kong ride called King Kong: 360 3-D at their Hollywood park, replacing the destroyed King Kong Encounter. On July 13, 2016, Universal opened a new King Kong attraction called Skull Island: Reign of Kong at Islands of Adventure in Orlando. In July 2013, Legendary Pictures reached an agreement with Universal in which it will market, co-finance, and distribute Legendary's films for five years starting in 2014 and ending in 2019, the year that Legendary's similar agreement with Warner Bros. Pictures was set to expire. Later, in July 2014 at the San Diego Comic-Con, Legendary announced (as a product of its partnership with Universal), a King Kong origin story, initially titled Skull Island, with Universal distributing. On December 12, 2014, the studio announced they had re-titled the film Kong: Skull Island. On September 10, 2015, it was announced that Universal would allow Legendary to move Kong: Skull Island to Warner Bros., so they could do a King Kong and Godzilla crossover film (in the continuity of the 2014 Godzilla movie), since Legendary still had the rights to make more Godzilla movies with Warner Bros. before their contract with Toho expired in 2020.

As noted above, Richard Cooper, through the Merian C. Cooper Estate, retained publishing rights for the content that Judge Real had ruled on December 6, 1976, belonged to Richard Cooper. In 1990, they licensed a six-issue comic book adaptation of the novelization of the 1933 film to Monster Comics, and commissioned an illustrated novel in 1994 called Anthony Browne's King Kong. In 2013, they became involved with a musical stage play based on the story, called King Kong: The Eighth Wonder of the World which premiered in June 2013 in Australia and then on Broadway in November 2018. The production is involved with Global Creatures, the company behind the Walking with Dinosaurs arena show. In 1996, artist/writer Joe DeVito partnered the Merian C. Cooper estate to write and/or illustrate various publications based on Merian C. Cooper's King Kong property through his company, DeVito ArtWorks, LLC. Through this partnership, DeVito created the prequel/sequel story Skull Island on which DeVito based a pair of original novels relating the origin of King Kong: Kong: King of Skull Island, and King Kong of Skull Island. In addition, the Cooper/DeVito collaboration resulted in an origin-themed comic book miniseries with Boom! Studios, an expanded rewrite of the original Lovelace novelization, Merian C. Cooper's King Kong, (the original novelization's publishing rights are still in the public domain), and various crossovers with other franchises such as Doc Savage, Tarzan and Planet of the Apes. In 2016, DeVito ArtWorks, through its licensing program, licensed its King Kong property to RocketFizz for use in the marketing of a soft drink called King Kong Cola, and had plans for a live action TV show to be co-produced between MarVista Entertainment and IM Global. Other products that have been produced through this licensing program include Digital Trading Cards, Board Games, a Virtual Reality Arcade Game, and a remake of the original King Kong Glow-In-The-Dark Model Kit. In April 2016, Joe DeVito sued Legendary Pictures and Warner Bros., producers of the film Kong: Skull Island, for using elements of his Skull Island universe, which he claimed that he created and that the producers had used without his permission. In August 2022, it was reported that DeVito had partnered with Disney to produce a live-action series tentatively called King Kong that will explore the origin story of Kong. The series is slated to stream on Disney+. Stephany Folsom is attached to write the series and to be executive produced by James Wan via his production company Atomic Monster Productions.

RKO (whose rights consisted of only the original film and its sequel) signed over the North American, Latin American and Australian distribution rights to its film library to Ted Turner in a period spanning 1986 to 1989 via his company Turner Entertainment. Turner merged his company into Time Warner (now Warner Bros. Discovery) in 1996, which is how Warner Bros. owns distribution rights in those regions to those two films today, with the copyright over the films (including King Kong and The Son of Kong) remaining with RKO Pictures, LLC (various companies distribute the RKO library in other territories). In 1998, Warner Bros. Family Entertainment released the direct-to-video animated musical film The Mighty Kong, which re-tells the plot of the original 1933 film. 19 years later; in 2017, Warners co-produced the film Kong: Skull Island and in 2021 co-produced the film Godzilla vs. Kong, after Legendary Pictures brought the projects over from Universal to build up the MonsterVerse. According to Godzilla Vs. Kong director Adam Wingard, the rights to the character may have also been transferred to Warner Bros.

DDL (whose rights were limited to only their 1976 remake) did a sequel in 1986 called King Kong Lives (but they still needed Universal's permission to do so). Today most of DDL's film library is owned by StudioCanal, which includes the rights to these two films. The domestic (North American) rights to the 1976 King Kong film still remain with the film's original distributor Paramount Pictures, with Trifecta Entertainment & Media handling television rights to the film via their license with Paramount.

Toho incarnations 

In the 1960s, Japanese studio Toho licensed the character from RKO and produced two films that featured the character, King Kong vs. Godzilla (1962) and King Kong Escapes (1967). Toho's interpretation differed greatly from the original in size and abilities. Among kaiju, King Kong was suggested to be among the most powerful in terms of raw physical force, possessing strength and durability that rivaled that of Godzilla. As one of the few mammal-based kaiju, Kong's most distinctive feature was his intelligence. He demonstrated the ability to learn and adapt to an opponent's fighting style, identify and exploit weaknesses in an enemy, and utilize his environment to stage ambushes and traps.

This version of Kong was given the ability to harvest electricity as a weapon and draw strength from electrical voltage. This version was more similar to the original, where he relied on strength and intelligence to fight and survive. Rather than residing on Skull Island, Toho's version of Kong resided on Faro Island in King Kong vs. Godzilla and on Mondo Island in King Kong Escapes.

In 1966, Toho planned to produce Operation Robinson Crusoe: King Kong vs. Ebirah as a co-production with Rankin/Bass Productions, however Ishirō Honda was unavailable at the time to direct the film and, as a result, Rankin/Bass backed out of the project, along with the King Kong license. Toho still proceeded with the production, replacing King Kong with Godzilla at the last minute and shot the film as Ebirah, Horror of the Deep. Elements of King Kong's character remained in the film, reflected in Godzilla's uncharacteristic behavior and attraction to the female character Daiyo. Toho and Rankin/Bass later negotiated their differences and co-produced King Kong Escapes in 1967, loosely based on Rankin/Bass' animated show.

Toho Studios wanted to remake King Kong vs. Godzilla, which was the most successful of the entire Godzilla series of films, in 1991 to celebrate the 30th anniversary of the film, as well as to celebrate Godzilla's upcoming 40th anniversary. However, they were unable to obtain the rights to use Kong, and initially intended to use Mechani-Kong as Godzilla's next adversary. But it was soon learned that even using a mechanical creature who resembled Kong would be just as problematic legally and financially for them. As a result, the film became Godzilla vs. King Ghidorah, with one last failed attempt made to use Kong in 2004's Godzilla: Final Wars. and also Godzilla (2014 video game) For the PS3 and PS4

Appearances

Film

Television
Three television shows have been based on King Kong: The King Kong Show (1966), Kong: The Animated Series (2000), and Kong: King of the Apes (2016).

In late January 2021, Netflix and Legendary Entertainment announced that an anime series adaptation, titled Skull Island, based on the franchise is in the works.

In August 2022, Disney Branded Television revealed that a live-action series exploring the origin story of Kong was in development for Disney+, written by Stephany Folsom and executive produced by James Wan via Atomic Monster Productions.

Cultural impact

King Kong, as well as the series of films featuring him, have been featured many times in popular culture outside of the films themselves, in forms ranging from straight copies to parodies and joke references, and in media from comic books to video games.

The Beatles' 1968 animated film Yellow Submarine includes a scene of the characters opening a door to reveal King Kong abducting a woman from her bed.

The Simpsons episode "Treehouse of Horror III" features a segment called "King Homer" which parodies the plot of the original film, with Homer as Kong and Marge in the Ann Darrow role. It ends with King Homer marrying Marge and eating her father.

The 2005 animated film Chicken Little features a scene parodying King Kong, as Fish out of Water starts stacking magazines thrown in a pile, eventually becoming a model of the Empire State Building and some plane models, as he imitates King Kong in the iconic scene from the original film.

The British comedy TV series The Goodies made an episode called "Kitten Kong", in which a giant cat called Twinkle roams the streets of London, knocking over the British Telecom Tower.

The controversial World War II Dutch resistance fighter Christiaan Lindemans—eventually arrested on suspicion of having betrayed secrets to the Nazis—was nicknamed "King Kong" due to his being exceptionally tall.

Frank Zappa and The Mothers of Invention recorded an instrumental about "King Kong" in 1967 and featured it on the album Uncle Meat. Zappa went on to make many other versions of the song on albums such as Make a Jazz Noise Here, You Can't Do That on Stage Anymore, Vol. 3, Ahead of Their Time, and Beat the Boots.

The Kinks recorded a song called "King Kong" as the B-side to their 1969 "Plastic Man" single.

In 1972, a  fiberglass statue of King Kong was erected in Birmingham, England.

The second track of The Jimmy Castor Bunch album Supersound from 1975 is titled "King Kong".

Filk Music artists Ookla the Mok's "Song of Kong", which explores the reasons why King Kong and Godzilla should not be roommates, appears on their 2001 album Smell No Evil.

Daniel Johnston wrote and recorded a song called "King Kong" on his fifth self-released music cassette, Yip/Jump Music in 1983, rereleased on CD and double LP by Homestead Records in 1988. The song is an a cappella narrative of the original movie's story line. Tom Waits recorded a cover version of the song with various sound effects on the 2004 release, The Late Great Daniel Johnston: Discovered Covered.

ABBA recorded "King Kong Song" for their 1974 album Waterloo. Although later singled out by ABBA songwriters Benny Andersson and Björn Ulvaeus as one of their weakest tracks, it was released as a single in 1977 to coincide with the 1976 film playing in theatres.

See also
 List of fictional primates

References

Citations

General and cited sources

External links

 The 1933 film 
 Official King Kong (2005) movie website
 The 2005 remake 
 

King Kong (franchise)
Animated characters
Fantasy film characters
Fictional apes
Film characters introduced in 1933
Fictional characters with superhuman strength
Fictional gorillas
Fictional kings
Fictional monsters
Godzilla characters
Kaiju
King Kong (franchise) characters
Science fiction film characters
Toho monsters
Male horror film villains